The National Council for Science and the Environment (NCSE) is an annual conference that brings together over 1,000 scientific, educational, business, civil society, and government professionals from diverse fields to explore the connections between science and decision-making associated with important environmental issues.

As part of the conference, NCSE also holds the annual John H. Chafee Memorial Lecture on Science and the Environment. The lecture provides a high-profile forum for communicating the importance and potential for science in environmental decision-making by featuring a renowned expert in that particular field. At the conference, participants develop policy recommendations and strategies to achieve science-based solutions to complex environmental problems. Following the conference, NCSE:

Produces and disseminates conference recommendations developed by participants
Provides briefings to Congress, other institutions, and decision-makers capable of implementing the conference recommendations
Strives to develop or facilitate the development of new programs based on recommendations from the conference
Publishes the John H. Chafee Memorial Lecture.

Goals for the National Conference

 Embrace a “solutions” focus for the meeting and its products
 Select conference topics that are major challenges to the entire world and to which science can contribute significantly toward solutions.
 Provide participants a rich “how-to” experience in the integration of environmental science and policy to develop solutions for major environmental challenges facing society.
 Increase the number and diversity of participants at the conference.
 Build on the meeting results in the other NCSE programs
 Integrate Affiliate universities and colleges into the meeting more broadly and encourage them to become a larger part of the implementation of the plans
 Utilize the conference to broaden the network of supporters of NCSE and its programs.

References

External links 
 

Environmental conferences